Cantor Mikhail Girgis El Batanouny ( Mikhail Georgios Phrembatanon) (also title Mu'allim, which is Arabic for "teacher") (14 September 1873 - 18 April 1957) was an expert in Coptic music, and knowledgeable in church rites, in addition to being skilled in the languages of Coptic and Arabic.

He was also the distinguished leader of cantors in the Great Cathedral, and was appointed to be the first instructor of hymns in the Coptic Orthodox Clerical College by Archdeacon Habib Girgis. When the Institute of Coptic Studies was established, Cantor Mikhail was appointed to be its first teacher of hymns. The hymns from Cantor Mikhail were the source of the vocal notes recorded by Ernest Newlandsmith, a musician and composer from England, with the help of Dr. Ragheb Moftah. In addition, Cantor Mikhail conducted the first audio recording of Coptic music. In light of this great achievement, Dr. Ragheb Moftah commented, "He was the only way of passing down Coptic hymns in its original form to us." And for all of these reasons, and many others, Cantor Mikhail el-Batanouni is considered to be the master of Coptic hymnology throughout Egypt. Hence, he is frequently referred to as "Cantor Mikhail the Great".

At the end of his journey, on 18 April 1957, Cantor Mikhail the Great departed, at the age of 83, after diligently serving the Coptic Orthodox Church for approximately 70 years. He left a great heritage of music, which was preserved by Dr. Ragheb Moftah in the United States Library of Congress. In addition, it was also cherished in the hearts and tongues of the cantors, who continuously chant them in their churches to this day. 

In an effort to express his deep sorrow for the loss of Cantor Mikhail, Dr. Ragheb Moftah said in his lamentation:

"You are like the River Nile that overflows to every corner of its valley. Your teachings have flooded the nations to its uttermost regions, and behold, they declare your name and everlasting treasure, as are the Pyramids that overlook the centuries. Your hymns, which the valley has echoed for thousands of years, you have preserved them for us, in a generation of alteration and change. Oh you of great heart! You have departed from this narrow place, and your spirit has joined in the world beyond, praising and chanting throughout the entire universe, glorifying the Holy of Holies."

Source: Summarized from A Recent History of Coptic Hymns by Deacon Albair Gamal, Heritage of the Coptic Orthodox Church.

See also
Institute of Coptic Studies
Coptic Orthodox Church
List of Copts

Egyptian people of Coptic descent
Coptic Orthodox Christians from Egypt
Coptic music
Coptic history
1873 births
1957 deaths